Continental is a 2013 documentary film, directed by Malcolm Ingram, about the history of the Continental Baths, a historic gay bathhouse in New York City. It is also, notably, Ingram's first film since 1999's Tail Lights Fade not to have Kevin Smith as a co-producer. The film was funded with help from Kickstarter.

Prominent figures appearing in the film, either in archival footage or in new interviews, include Jaye P. Morgan, Holly Woodlawn, Michael Musto, Frankie Knuckles, Bette Midler and Sarah Dash.

The film premiered at the SXSW festival on March 10, 2013.

References

External links

2013 documentary films
2013 LGBT-related films
2013 films
American documentary films
American LGBT-related films
Films directed by Malcolm Ingram
Documentary films about New York City
Historiography of LGBT in New York City
Documentary films about LGBT topics
Gay-related films
2010s English-language films
2010s American films